Man of The World may refer to:

Film and television
 Man of the World  (film), a film by Richard Wallace
 Man of the World  (TV series), a 1962–1963 British drama series

Music
 "Man of the World" (song), a song by Peter Green
 Man of the World (album), a 1980 album by Demis Roussos
 Man of the World, a 2010 album by Animal Liberation Orchestra
 "Man of the World", a song by Marc Cohn on the 2004 soundtrack for the film The Prince & Me

Others
 Man of the World  (novel), a novel by Henry Mackenzie
 Man of the World  (play), a play by Charles Macklin
 Man of the World (publication), American international quarterly lifestyle publication
 Man of the World (pageant), an annual international male beauty pageant